Industrial Light & Magic (ILM) is an American motion picture visual effects company that was founded on May 26, 1975 by George Lucas. It is a division of the film production company Lucasfilm, which Lucas founded, and was created when he began production on the original Star Wars, now the fourth episode of the Skywalker Saga.

ILM originated in Van Nuys, California, then later moved to San Rafael in 1978, and since 2005 it has been based at the Letterman Digital Arts Center in the Presidio of San Francisco. In 2012, The Walt Disney Company acquired ILM as part of its purchase of Lucasfilm.

History 
Lucas wanted his 1977 film Star Wars to include visual effects that had never been seen on film before. After discovering that the in-house effects department at 20th Century Fox was no longer operational, Lucas approached Douglas Trumbull, best known for the effects on 2001: A Space Odyssey (1968) and Silent Running (1972). Trumbull declined as he was already committed to working on Steven Spielberg's film Close Encounters of the Third Kind (1977), but suggested his assistant John Dykstra to Lucas. Dykstra brought together a small team of college students, artists, and engineers and set them up in a warehouse in Van Nuys, California. After seeing the map for the location was zoned as light industrial, Lucas named the group Industrial Light and Magic, which became the Special Visual Effects department on Star Wars. Alongside Dykstra, other leading members of the original ILM team were Ken Ralston, Richard Edlund, Dennis Muren, Robert Blalack, Joe Johnston, Phil Tippett, Steve Gawley, Lorne Peterson, and Paul Huston.

In late 1978, when in pre-production for The Empire Strikes Back, Lucas reformed most of the team into Industrial Light & Magic in Marin County, California. From here on, the company expanded and has since gone on to produce special effects for over three hundred films, including the entire Star Wars saga, the Indiana Jones series, and the Jurassic Park series.

In addition to their work for George Lucas, ILM also collaborates with Steven Spielberg on many films that he directs and produces. Dennis Muren has acted as Computer Animation Supervisor on many of these films. For Jurassic Park in 1993, ILM used the program Viewpaint, which allowed the visual effects artists to paint color and texture directly onto the surface of the computer models. Former ILM CG Animator Steve "Spaz" Williams said that it took nearly a year for the shots that involved computer-generated dinosaurs to be completed. The film is noted for its groundbreaking use of computer-generated imagery, and is regarded as a landmark for visual effects. The company also works on more subtle special effects effects—such as widening streets, digitally adding more extras to a shot, and inserting the film's actors into preexisting footage—in films such as in Forrest Gump in 1994.

After the success of the first Star Wars movie, Lucas became interested in using computer graphics on the sequel. He contacted Triple-I, known for their early computer effects in movies like Westworld (1973), Futureworld (1976), Tron (1982), and The Last Starfighter which ended up making a computer-generated test of five X-wing fighters flying in formation. He found it to be too expensive and returned to handmade models. Nevertheless, the test had showed him it was possible, and he decided he would create his own computer graphics department instead. As a result, they started investing in Apple and SGI computers. One of Lucas' employees was given the task to find the right people to hire. His search would lead him to NYIT, where he found Edwin Catmull and his colleagues. Catmull and others accepted Lucas' job offer, and a new computer division at ILM was created in 1979 with the hiring of Ed Catmull as the first NYIT employee who joined Lucasfilm. Lucas' list for them was a digital film editing system, a digital sound editing system, a laser film printer, and further exploration of computer graphics. John Lasseter, who was hired a few years later, worked on computer-animation as part of ILM's contribution to Young Sherlock Holmes. The Graphics Group was later sold to Steve Jobs, named Pixar Animation Studios, and created the first CGI-animated feature, Toy Story. In 2000, ILM created the OpenEXR format for high-dynamic-range imaging.

ILM operated from an inconspicuous property in San Rafael, California until 2005. The company was known to locals as The Kerner Company, a name that did not draw any attention, allowing the company to operate in secret, thus preventing the compromise of sensitive information on its productions to the media or fans. In 2005, when Lucas decided to move locations to the Presidio of San Francisco and focus on digital effects, a management-led team bought the five physical and practical effects divisions and formed a new company that included the George Lucas Theater, retained the "Kerner" name as Kerner Technologies, Inc. and provided physical effects for major motion pictures, often working with ILM, until its Chapter 7 bankruptcy in 2011.

In 2005, ILM extended its operations to Lucasfilm Singapore, which also includes the Singapore arm of Lucasfilm Animation. In 2006, ILM invented IMoCap (Image Based Motion Capture Technology). By 2007, ILM was one of the largest visual effects vendors in the motion picture industry and had one of the largest render farms (named Death Star). In 2011, it was announced the company was considering a project-based facility in Vancouver. ILM first opened a temporary facility in Vancouver before relocating to a new 30,000-square-foot studio on Water Street in the Gastown district in 2014.

In October 2012, Disney bought ILM's parent company, Lucasfilm, acquiring ILM, Skywalker Sound, and LucasArts in the process. Disney stated that it had no immediate plans to change ILM's operations, but began to lay off employees by April of the next year. Following the restructuring of LucasArts in April 2013, ILM was left overstaffed and the faculty was reduced to serve only ILM's visual effects department. ILM opened a London studio headquartered in the city's Soho district on October 15, 2014.

On November 7, 2018, ILM opened a new division targeted at television series called ILM TV. It will be based in ILM's new 47,000-square-foot London studio with support from the company's locations in San Francisco, Vancouver and Singapore. In July 2019, ILM announced the opening of a new facility in Sydney, Australia. In the same year, ILM introduced StageCraft. Also known as "The Volume", it uses high-definition LED video walls to generate virtual sceneries and was first used in The Mandalorian. Following Disney's acquisition of 21st Century Fox, Fox VFX Lab was folded into ILM, including the Technoprops division. In October 2022, ILM opened a new studio in Mumbai.

Milestones 

 1975: Resurrected the use of VistaVision; first use of a motion control camera (Star Wars: Episode IV - A New Hope)
 1980: First use of Go motion to animate the Tauntaun creatures of Star Wars: Episode V - The Empire Strikes Back
 1982: First in-house completely computer-generated sequence — the "Genesis sequence" in Star Trek II: The Wrath of Khan. (Previous computer graphics in Star Wars - Episode IV: A New Hope were done outside of ILM.)
 1985: First completely computer-generated character, the "stained glass man" in Young Sherlock Holmes
 1988: First morphing sequence, in Willow
 1989: First digital compositing of a full-screen live action image during the final sequence in Indiana Jones and the Last Crusade
 1989: First computer-generated 3-D character to show emotion, the pseudopod creature in The Abyss
 1991: First dimensional matte painting — where a traditional matte painting was mapped onto 3-D geometry, allowing for camera parallax, in Hook.
 1991: First partially computer-generated main character, the T-1000 in Terminator 2: Judgment Day
 1992: First time the texture of human skin was computer generated, in Death Becomes Her
 1993: First time digital technology used to create a complete and detailed living creature, the dinosaurs in Jurassic Park, which earned ILM its thirteenth Oscar
 1994: First extensive use of digital manipulation of historical and stock footage to integrate characters in Forrest Gump.
 1995: First fully synthetic speaking computer-generated character, with a distinct personality and emotion, to take a leading role in Casper
 1995: First computer-generated photo-realistic hair and fur (used for the digital lion and monkeys) in Jumanji
 1996: First completely computer-generated main character, Draco in Dragonheart
 1999: First computer generated character to have a full human anatomy, Imhotep in The Mummy
 1999: The first fully computer-generated character in a live-action film using motion capture, Jar Jar Binks in Star Wars: Episode I - The Phantom Menace
 2000: Creates OpenEXR imaging format. 
 2006: Develops iMocap system, which uses computer vision techniques to track live-action performers on set. Used in the creation of Davy Jones and ship's crew in the film Pirates of the Caribbean: Dead Man's Chest
 2011: First animated feature produced by ILM, Rango
 2019: First use of real time rendering (with Unreal Engine) and digital LED displays as a virtual set (known as StageCraft or The Volume), The Mandalorian

Notable employees and clients 
Photoshop was first used at the Industrial Light & Magic as an image-processing program. Photoshop was created by ILM Visual Effects Supervisor John Knoll and his brother Thomas as a summer project. It was used on The Abyss. The Knoll brothers sold the program to Adobe shortly before the film's release. Thomas Knoll continues to work on Photoshop at Adobe and is featured in the billing on the Photoshop splash screen. John Knoll continues to be ILM's top visual effects supervisor, and was one of the executive producers and writers of Rogue One: A Star Wars Story.

Adam Savage, Grant Imahara and Tory Belleci of MythBusters fame have all worked at ILM.

Industrial Light & Magic is also famous for their commercial work. Their clients include Energizer, Benson & Hedges, Apple, Nike, Coca-Cola, Pepsi, Budweiser, McDonald's, Nickelodeon and other companies.

Actor Masi Oka worked on several major ILM productions as a programmer, including Revenge of the Sith, before joining the cast of the NBC show Heroes as Hiro Nakamura.

American film director David Fincher worked at ILM for four years in the early 1980s.

Film director Joe Johnston was a Visual effects artist and an Art Director.

Film Director Mark A.Z. Dippé was a Visual Effects animator who directed Spawn which was released in 1997.

ILM Filmography

Animation

VFX

1970s–1980s

1990s

2000s

2010s

2020s

Future projects

ILM Television

Television series

Upcoming

Television films & specials

ILM Commercial 

 General Cinema (1986, 1993, 1996)
 THX (1988, 1993)
 Merrill Lynch "Desert Skies" and "Bullseye" (1990)
 Nike (1992, 1999)
 BP (1993)
 Perrier (1993)
 Intel (1993)
 3M "Imagine" (1994)
 Ford Mercury "Launch" (1995)
 TGI Fridays (1995)
 Supercuts "Stylin'" (1995)
 Coca-Cola Classic (1995)
 BMW (1996)
 Snapple "Mikey" (1996)
 Canada Dry, "Domino" (1996)
 General Motors EV1 "Appliances" (1996)
 DreamWorks Pictures (1997)
 Pontiac "Coyote" (1998, with Warner Bros. Classic Animation)
 Armor All (1998)
 First Union Bank (1998)
 GoodHome.com (1999)
 Honey Comb, "Crazy Craving" (2000-3)
 Gatorade, "Raptor" (2000)
 California Raisin Marketing Board (print ads; 2000)
 Budweiser "Come Home" (2001)
 Alcatel, "MLK" (2001)
 Reese's Pieces, "E.T." (2002)
 Walt Disney Pictures (2022)

See also 
 Moving Picture Company (MPC)
 Digital Domain
 DNEG
 Framestore
 Animal Logic
 Sony Pictures Imageworks
 Pacific Data Images
 Blue Sky Studios
 Rhythm & Hues
 Wētā FX
 Wētā Workshop
 Image Engine
 Square Enix Image Studio Division
 Pixar Animation Studios
 Softimage 3D
 Tippett Studio
 Computer Systems Research Group

References

External links 
  (with detailed information in PDF format)
 Small entry at Lucasfilm's site

Lucasfilm
Computer animation
Visual effects companies
Entertainment companies based in California
Entertainment companies established in 1975
Mass media companies established in 1975
1975 establishments in California
Companies based in San Francisco
National Medal of Technology recipients
Disney acquisitions
Academy Award for Technical Achievement winners